Bologna is a station on Line B of the Rome Metro. It is an underground station located under Piazza Bologna (at the intersection of Viale XXI Aprile, Via Livorno, Via Michele di Lando, Via Lorenzo il Magnifico, Viale delle Province, Via Sambucuccio d'Alando, Via Ravenna). It was opened on 8 December 1990. Its atrium houses mosaics from the Artemetro Roma prize, by Giuseppe Uncini and Vittorio Matino (Italy), Karl Gerstner (Switzerland) and Ulrich Erben (Germany). It was involved in the October 2005 building works for line B1, a branch line off line B.

Connections 
Routes (terminate here): 309, 445;
Routes: 61, 62, 310, 542 workdays and holidays;
Nearby routes (via Catania direction): 490, 495, 649;
Night buses: n2, n2L, n13.

Surroundings 
 Piazza Bologna
 Post office of piazza Bologna – Mario Ridolfi (1933–35)
 Sant'Agnese fuori le mura
 mausoleum of Santa Costanza
 Villa Torlonia
 Museo Casina delle Civette
 Jewish catacombs
 Villa Ricotti
 Chiesa di Sant'Ippolito

Services 
The station has:
 Disabled access
 Lift
 Escalators

References

External links 
Bologna on ATAC
Images of the mosaics

Rome Metro Line B stations
Railway stations opened in 1990
1990 establishments in Italy
Rome Q. V Nomentano
Railway stations in Italy opened in the 20th century